Ernest Claude Wills (March 28, 1892 – December 24, 1976) was an American football, basketball, and baseball coach. He served as the head football coach at Tempe Normal School, now Arizona State University, in 1922 and at Chadron State College in 1924, compiling a career college football record of 8–4–1. Wills was also the head basketball coach at Tempe Normal in 1922–23, tallying a mark of 8–4, and the head baseball coach at the school in 1923, guiding his baseball squad to a 5–5 record.  Wills graduated the University of Iowa in 1916 with a degree in engineering. He played on the Iowa Hawkeyes football team from 1913 through 1915.

Wills graduated from Clinton High School in Clinton, Iowa. In 1923, he was hired physical director and coach at Fremont High School in Fremont, Nebraska. Wills died on December 24, 1976, at St. Joseph Hospital in Bryan, Texas.

Head coaching record

College football

References

External links
 

1892 births
1976 deaths
Arizona State Sun Devils athletic directors
Arizona State Sun Devils baseball coaches
Arizona State Sun Devils football coaches
Arizona State Sun Devils men's basketball coaches
Basketball coaches from Iowa
Chadron State Eagles football coaches
Chadron State Eagles men's basketball coaches
Iowa Hawkeyes football players
High school football coaches in Nebraska
People from Clinton, Iowa
Players of American football from Iowa